Spaceman is an upcoming American science fiction drama film directed by Johan Renck and written by Colby Day, based on the 2017 novel Spaceman of Bohemia by Jaroslav Kalfař. The film stars Adam Sandler, Paul Dano, Carey Mulligan, Kunal Nayyar, and Isabella Rossellini.

Spaceman is scheduled to be released in the Fall of 2023, by Netflix.

Premise

Cast
 Adam Sandler as Jakub Procházka
 Paul Dano as Hanuš
 Carey Mulligan as Lenka
 Kunal Nayyar
 Isabella Rossellini

Production 
In October 2020, Netflix announced that the novel Spaceman of Bohemia would be adapted by screenwriter Colby Day into a feature film of the same name directed by Johan Renck and starring Adam Sandler. In April 2021, Carey Mulligan was added to the cast, and the film was retitled Spaceman. On April 19, 2021 it was announced that Paul Dano and Kunal Nayyar joined the cast.

Principal photography began in April 19, 2021, in New York City, and wrapped on July 1, 2021, in the Czech Republic.

References

External links
 

Upcoming films
2023 films
American science fiction drama films
English-language Netflix original films
Films based on Czech novels
Films based on science fiction novels
Films directed by Johan Renck
Films scored by Max Richter
Films shot in the Czech Republic
Films shot in New York City
Upcoming English-language films
Upcoming Netflix original films